Elisa Wald-Lasowski (born 15 November 1984) is a French actress, most notable for her film and television work. She grew up in the Netherlands, Algeria and France. She is fluent in French, English, Spanish, Dutch and German.

Acting
Lasowski has acted roles in productions including Eastern Promises (2007), Somers Town (2008), Line of Duty (2012), Game of Thrones (2013), Hyena (2014), Burnt (2015), Versailles (2015-2018), and Kompromat (2022). She appeared as the "girl with a tail" in the music video for David Bowie's song "Blackstar".

In November 2018, she became the face of a new Loewe fragrance.

References

External links
 

Living people
British actresses
French film actresses
21st-century British actresses
21st-century French actresses
1986 births